Child marriage in Zimbabwe is common. As of 2019, approximately 1 in 3 girls in Zimbabwe are married before age 18.

Early pregnancy can pose a health risk. In July 2021, a 15-year-old girl, who was married to a 26-year-old man, died giving birth inside a church.

2016 key indicators of child marriage in Zimbabwe

References 

Zimbabwe
Childhood in Africa
Society of Zimbabwe
Marriage in Africa